DanTysk is a 288 megawatt (MW) offshore wind farm in the North Sea  west of the island Sylt, in the German EEZ at the border to Denmark. The wind farm operates 80 Siemens Wind Power's SWT-3.6-120 turbines with a capacity of 3.6 MW each.

The project's estimated cost was $900 million. The turbines were kept warm and healthy with diesel generators for 6 months before onshore cabling was fixed. The farm sent first power to shore in December 2014.

Initially the project was developed by Geo Gesellschaft für Energie und Ökologie. The project was purchased by Vattenfall in 2007. In 2010, Vattenfall sold 49% stake in the project to Stadtwerke München.

The SylWin transformer platform connects the power from DanTysk, Butendiek and Sandbank offshore wind farm to shore. A DKK 375 million accommodation platform for 50 people is being built to service both DanTysk and Sandbank, inspired by Poseidon at Horns Rev 2.

See also

Wind power in Germany
List of offshore wind farms

References

External links

Wind farms in Germany
Offshore wind farms in the North Sea
2014 establishments in Germany
Energy infrastructure completed in 2014